David Jason Weiner (born September 24, 1976) is an American musician, best known for being one of Steve Vai's touring guitarists. He also posts instructional videos, called the "Riff of the Week", every Wednesday on YouTube, iTunes and his own website. He also gives online lessons.

Joining Steve Vai 
Weiner first joined Vai's band when Weiner went to Los Angeles to go to GIT. During his time there he got a job as an intern for an office, and his boss at this office managed Steve Vai. He would deliver paper to Vai's house, and Weiner got to know him personally and subsequently gave him a demo. About two weeks later his boss got a phone call from Vai and was asked to come over to Vai's studio, learn fourteen songs, and go on tour with him. Weiner continues to tour on Vai's personal tours as well as with G3.

Solo 
Weiner has also released three solo albums. The first, entitled Shove the Sun Aside was released originally in June 2004 on the Meyer Jane Music label and re-released in March 2005 on Favored Nations. It is an instrumental album on which Weiner primarily plays a seven-string guitar. Weiner continues to tour with his own band. His second album On Revolute started shipping on May 25, 2010. His third album contains 10 acoustic songs and is titled A Collection of Short Stories: Vol. 1. It was released August 10, 2012.

Discography 
Shove the Sun Aside (2004)
Shove the Sun Aside (Re-release) (2005)
On Revolute (2010)
A Collection of Short Stories: Vol. 1 (2012)
Stsa-X (2016)
A Collection of Short Stories: Vol. 2 (2021)

References

External links
 Official Website
 Steve Vai's Official Website
 Riff Of The Week

1976 births
Seven-string guitarists
Living people
21st-century guitarists
Favored Nations artists